James Benjamin Martel is a physician, surgeon and scientist. He is former Chair of Surgery, Mercy San Juan Medical Center, former Chief of Ophthalmology, Otolaryngology (ENT), and Plastic Surgery, Sutter Roseville Medical Center.  He is the former Director of Ophthalmology, Sutter General and Memorial Hospitals and assistant professor of Ophthalmology and Radiology, Johns Hopkins Medical School and Wilmer Ophthalmological Institute. He is currently Clinical Professor of Ophthalmology and Associate Dean of Graduate Medical Education in California Northstate University College of Medicine.

Early life

James Martel received a Bachelor of Science degree from Stanford University; a Doctor of Medicine from Harvard Medical School; a Masters in Public Health in the area of Epidemiology and Biostatistics from the Harvard School of Public Health and received his surgical subspecialty training in ophthalmology from Johns Hopkins Medical School and Wilmer Ophthalmological Institute.  In the early 1980s, while at Harvard Medical School, Howe Laboratory of Ophthalmology, Massachusetts Eye and Ear Infirmary, he was among the first investigators to apply NMR spectroscopy to study tissue metabolism non-destructively.  The research was able to demonstrate the conversion of glucose to sorbitol in the single intact lens which supported the hypothesis that sorbitol led tissue damage in diabetes. The condition of diabetes leads to uncontrolled levels of glucose in the body.  The ability to monitor glucose and its metabolism in by non-invasive methodology in living tissue allows facilitated the understanding of this disease state.

His research on the living lens was used to understand diabetic cataract formation. During this time, in collaboration with Dr. Leo Chylack, Jr., he demonstrated the statistical correlation between diabetes and posterior subcapsular cataracts. For this specific work, he was awarded the Soma Weiss Award from Harvard Medical School.  Aguayo Martel further probed the association of human behavior and cataract formation using non-linear regression analysis.

Career

After finishing his internship at the Beth Israel Hospital in Boston, he moved to Baltimore where at Johns Hopkins medical institutions, Dr. Martel led a research team as the associate director of NMR Research, which developed Nuclear Magnetic Resonance (NMR) Microscopy, a technique for non-invasively obtaining microscopic three-dimensional images of living objects.  The technique first applied to a single living cell signaled the advent of a new class of instruments which would eventually allow monitoring cellular structures and their biochemistry inside the human body, or to perform "biopsies" without needles or surgery. 
He applied his MR microscopy to the study of ocular tissues and tumors and used histological correlation to refine his technique. 
Dr. Martel was the first to study the biophysical properties of vitreous using NMR spectroscopy and imaging.
After the analysis of this ocular structure, he extended his research into the area of vitreous hemorrhage (bleeding into the eye), an area of great importance in loss of sight.  During this time period he explored the use of three dimensional computerized tomography (CT) for the localization and compositional evaluation of intraocular and orbital foreign bodies.

He pioneered the technique of deuterium NMR spectroscopy to study metabolism in biological systems. This technique extended the capabilities of existing NMR spectroscopy techniques used to investigate tissue metabolism.  Dr. Martel applied his technique to the understanding of diabetic cataract formation and corneal metabolism in order to create new and improved methods of tissue preservation for improved tissue transplantation.   He developed a novel method for monitoring activity in multiple metabolic pathways (hexose monophosphate shunt, glycolysis, and the polyol pathway) in the single living lens which allowed insight into the study of diabetic cataractogenesis. and applied to corneal tissue transplantation. His work culminated in the development of chemical shift NMR Microscopy, which combined Magnetic Resonance imaging (MRI) and spectroscopy analysis while working at the Francis Bitter National Magnet Laboratory, Massachusetts Institute of Technology.  His research team applied the technique to the study of the living lens to study diabetic cataractogenesis.

In 1987, Dr. Aguayo Martel was an invited lecturer at the American Physical Society; the Symposium of the Committee on Applications of Physics: Microtomography-New Three Dimensional Microscopy and presented Grand Rounds at the National Eye Institute, National Institutes of Health on "A New Model of Diabetic Cataractogenesis."  The understanding of the metabolism of glucose into sorbitol in the diabetic state has led to the development of a class of medications (aldose reductase inhibitor) to prevent eye and nerve damage in people with diabetes.

Dr. Martel is also noted for his work in low illumination ophthalmoscopy and co-inventing the technique of Intraepikeratophakia  
a precursor to the technique of LASIK.  Although Dr. Martel is most noted for his pioneering work in the fields of MRI, NMR spectroscopy, ocular metabolism and diabetes; his most accomplished work has been in the area of acute, ocular emergency and ocular trauma to which he has devoted the past twenty years of his career. Dr. Aguayo Martel continues to serve as Director of Ocular Trauma, Chairman of the Surgery Department, Mercy San Juan Medical Center; Chief of Ophthalmology, Otolaryngology (ENT), and Plastic Surgery, Sutter Roseville Medical Center and manages ocular trauma for Sutter Health Sacramento Sierra Region. He is a Fellow of the American College of Surgeons  and the American Academy of Ophthalmology.

References

External links
 Harvard School of Public Health
 Wilmer Eye Institute at Johns Hopkins
 Archives of Ophthalmology
 Francis Bitter Magnet Laboratory, MIT
 Howe Laboratory of Ophthalmology
 Sutter Roseville Medical Center

Living people
American biochemists
American ophthalmologists
Carmichael, California
Dignity Health
Harvard Medical School alumni
Harvard Medical School faculty
Harvard School of Public Health alumni
Johns Hopkins School of Medicine alumni
Mexican emigrants to the United States
People from Sacramento County, California
Stanford University alumni
Year of birth missing (living people)